Treat Huey and Scott Lipsky were the defending champions, but chose not to compete together. Huey played alongside Max Mirnyi, but lost in the semifinals to Eric Butorac and Lipsky.
Butorac and Lipsky went on to win the title, defeating Łukasz Kubot and Marcin Matkowski in the final, 6–4, 3–6, [10–8].

Seeds

Draw

Draw

References
 Main Draw

Doubles